Maksyutovo (Mäqsüt) is a rural locality (a village) in Ashkadarsky Selsoviet, Sterlitamaksky District, Bashkortostan, Russia. The population was 139 as of 2010. There are 2 streets.

Geography 
Maxyutovo is located 35 km southwest of Sterlitamak (the district's administrative centre) by road. Novofyodorovskoye is the nearest rural locality.

References 

Rural localities in Sterlitamaksky District